The Masnavi, or Masnavi-ye-Ma'navi, also written Mathnawi,  or Mathnavi, is an extensive poem written in Persian by Jalal al-Din Muhammad Balkhi, also known as Rumi. The Masnavi is one of the most influential works of Sufism, ascribed to be like a "Quran in Persian". It has been viewed by many commentators as the greatest mystical poem in world literature. The Masnavi is a series of six books of poetry that together amount to around 25,000 verses or 50,000 lines. It is a spiritual text that teaches Sufis how to reach their goal of being truly in love with God.

General description

The title Masnavi-ye-Ma'navi means "The Spiritual Couplets". The Masnavi is a poetic collection of anecdotes and stories derived from the Quran, hadith sources, and everyday tales. Stories are told to illustrate a point and each moral is discussed in detail. It incorporates a variety of Islamic wisdom but primarily focuses on emphasizing inward personal Sufi interpretation. In contrast to Rumi's Diwan, the Masnavi is a relatively "sober" text. It explains the various dimensions of spiritual life and practice to Sufi disciples and anyone who wishes to ponder the meaning of life.

Creation

The Masnavi was started by Rumi during the final years of his life. He began dictating the first book around the age of 54 around the year 1258 and continued composing verses until his death in 1273. The sixth and final book would remain incomplete.

It is documented that Rumi began dictating the verses of the Masnavi at the request of his favourite disciple, Husam al-Din Chalabi, who observed that many of Rumi's followers dutifully read the works of Sana'i and 'Attar. Thus, Rumi began creating a work in the didactic style of Sana'i and 'Attar to complement his other poetry. These men are said to have met regularly in meetings where Rumi would deliver the verses and Chalabi would write them down and recite them back to him.

Each book consists of about 4,000 verses and contains its own prose introduction and prologue. The inconclusive ending of the sixth volume has given rise to suggestions that the work was not complete at the time of Rumi's death, as well as to claims about existence of another volume.

Themes and narrative devices 

The six books of the Masnavi can be divided into three groups of two because each pair is linked by a common theme:
 Books 1 and 2: They "are principally concerned with the nafs, the lower carnal self, and its self-deception and evil tendencies."
 Books 3 and 4: These books share the principal themes of Reason and Knowledge. These two themes are personified by Rumi in the Biblical and Quranic figure of the Prophet Moses.
 Books 5 and 6: These last two books are joined by the universal ideal that man must deny his physical earthly existence to understand God's existence.

In addition to the recurring themes presented in each book, Rumi includes multiple points of view or voices inviting the reader to fall into "imaginative enchantment."  There are seven principal voices that Rumi uses in his writing:
 The Authorial Voice – Conveys the authority of a Sufi teacher and generally appears in verses addressed to You, God, or you, of all humankind.
 The Story-telling Voice – May be interrupted by side stories that help clarify a statement, sometime taking hundreds of lines to make a point. 
 The Analogical Voice – Interruptions to the flow of narration in order to explain a statement by use of analogy.
 The Voice of Speech and Dialogue of Characters – Many of the stories are told through dialogue between characters.
 The Moral Reflection – Supported by quotations from the Quran and hadith
 The Spiritual Discourse – Similar to analogical and model reflections.
 Hiatus – Rumi occasionally questions his own verses and writes that he cannot say more because the reader would not be capable of understanding.

The Masnavi has no framed plot and includes a variety of scenes, from popular stories and scenes of the local bazaar to fables and tales from Rumi's time. It also includes quotations from the Qur'an and from hadith, accounts from the time of Mohammed.

Although there is no constant frame, style, or plot, Rumi generally follows a certain writing pattern that flows in the following order:

Problem/Theme → Complication → Resolution

English versions

Direct translations from Persian
 Mathnawi Rumi, translation with commentary by M. G. Gupta with Rajeev, in six volumes Hardbound edition, M.G. Publishers, Agra, Paperback edition, Huma Books, 34 Hirabagh Colony, Agra 282005, India. Source material is the Farsi Dari text circulated by the Department of Culture, Government of India, New Delhi.
 The Mesnevi of Mevlānā Jelālu'd-dīn er-Rūmī. Book first, together with some account of the life and acts of the Author, of his ancestors, and of his descendants, illustrated by a selection of characteristic anedocts, as collected by their historian, Mevlānā Shemsu'd-dīn Ahmed el-Eflākī el-'Arifī, translated and the poetry versified by James W. Redhouse, London: 1881. Contains the translation of the first book only.
 Masnaví-i Ma'naví, the Spiritual Couplets of Mauláná Jalálu'd-din Muhammad balkhi, translated and abridged by E. H. Whinfield, London: 1887; 1989. Abridged version from the complete poem. On-line editions at Sacred Texts and on wikisource.
 The Masnavī by Jalālu'd-din balkhi or Rūmī. Book II, translated for the first time from the Persian into prose, with a Commentary, by C.E. Wilson, London: 1910.
 The Mathnawí of Jalálu'ddín balkhi, edited from the oldest manuscripts available, with critical notes, translation and commentary by Reynold A. Nicholson, in 8 volumes, London: Messrs Luzac & Co., 1925–1940. Contains the text in Persian. First complete English translation of the Mathnawí.
 The Masnavi: Book One, translated by Jawid Mojaddedi, Oxford World's Classics Series, Oxford University Press, 2004. . Translated for the first time from the Persian edition prepared by Mohammad Estelami, with an introduction and explanatory notes. Awarded the 2004 Lois Roth Prize for excellence in translation of Persian literature by the American Institute of Iranian Studies.
 balkhi, Spiritual Verses, The First Book of the Masnavi-ye Ma'navi, newly translated from the latest Persian edition of M. Este'lami, with an Introduction on a reader's approach to balkhi's writing, and with explanatory Notes, by Alan Williams, London and New York, Penguin Classics, Penguin, xxxv + 422 pp. 2006 .
 The Masnavi: Book Two, translated by Jawid Mojaddedi, Oxford World's Classics Series, Oxford University Press, 2007. . The first ever verse translation of the unabridged text of Book Two, with an introduction and explanatory notes.
 The Masnavi: Book Three, translated by Jawid Mojaddedi, Oxford World's Classics Series, Oxford University Press, 2013. . The first ever verse translation of the unabridged text of Book Three, with an introduction and explanatory notes.
 The Masnavi: Book Four, translated by Jawid Mojaddedi, Oxford World's Classics Series, Oxford University Press, 2017. .
 The Masnavi: Book Five, translated by Jawid Mojaddedi, Oxford World's Classics Series, Oxford University Press, 2022.

Paraphrases of English translations
 The Essential balkhi, translated by Coleman Barks with John Moyne, A. J. Arberry, Reynold Nicholson, San Francisco: Harper Collins, 1996 ; Edison (NJ) and New York: Castle Books, 1997 . Selections.
 The Illuminated balkhi, translated by Coleman Barks, Michael Green contributor, New York: Broadway Books, 1997 .

Urdu and Persian interpretations 
 Keys of Masnavi * (Kelid Masnavi), Volume 1 and 2, Ashrafali Thanvi, interpreter: Samira Gilani, Asra Institute and Rashedin Publication, Tehran: 2018.

See also
 List of stories in the Masnavi
 Mathnawi

References

Further reading
 RUMI, JALĀL-AL-DIN. Encyclopædia Iranica, online edition, 2014.
 Mahmoud Ordudari. Proverbs in the Masnavi: A collection of poems and proverbs from the Masnavi, 2016.

External links

 
 Farsi Dari version is available at www.RumiSite.com
 Guardian series of blogs on the Masnavi by Franklin Lewis, 2009
 An abridged version translated by E.H. Whinfield, (1898)
 Dar al Masnavi
 Treasure of National Library of Turkey 18th century Masnavi in Nesih calligraphy, Herat
 The Song of the Reed (part one)
 Urdu poetic forms
 Masnavi-e Ma'navi, recited in Persian by Mohammad Ghanbar

Works by Rumi
Sufi literature
Persian poems
Mystical books
Kalam
Sunni literature
Maturidi literature
Islamic theology books
Mathnawi